Craig Coleman (born 31 January 1963) is an Australian former professional rugby league footballer, and coach.

Playing career
Coleman was graded to South Sydney as a seventeen-year-old in 1980. In 1981 he played in the under-23 side coached by Brian Smith which lost only two games in the season and won the Grand Final at the Sydney Cricket Ground.

He made his first-grade début for South Sydney in round 14 of the 1982 season, playing off the bench against the Canterbury-Bankstown Bulldogs at Redfern Oval. His first match at halfback was in round 22 of the 1982 season against Peter Sterling, and the Parramatta Eels at Redfern Oval.

During his eleven seasons with Souths, Coleman spent three off-seasons playing in England - Widnes, Hull FC and Leeds. After he was released by Souths at the end of the 1992 season, he played a fourth off-season in England, for Salford.

Due to his late return to Australia (after the 1 February signing deadline), Coleman was unable to sign with the Gold Coast for the 1993 season. He threatened to take the Australian Rugby League to court when he was denied the clearance but spent the year playing park football for the Coogee Wombats in Souths' A-grade competition. He was back in first grade in 1994 with the Gold Coast Seagulls, and finished his first-grade career playing one season for the Western Suburbs Magpies in 1996 under coach, Tommy Raudonikis.

Coaching career
Coleman returned to the Rabbitohs as a reserve-grade coach and took over from Steve Martin as first-grade coach in round 19 of the 1998 season.

In 2000, the Rabbitohs were excluded from the National Rugby League competition. Coleman, while working as a baggage handler for Ansett, joined the fight to have the club included in the competition. On the club's return in the 2002 season, Coleman was once again head coach but after a poor season the South Sydney board considered his position in late September. A split decision opted to retain Coleman as coach but revised the coaching staff, appointing Phil Blake (former Souths utility player) as the club's new coaching coordinator with
Paul Langmack appointed as defensive coach. Five months later and only eleven days before the official start of the 2003 season, Coleman was sacked by the club after a series of losses in the pre-season trials. Under his coaching, the Rabbitohs won 17 of 54 games (31%) over three playing seasons. 1999 was the most successful of Coleman's coaching seasons in NRL, with the Rabbitohs narrowly missing the semi finals.

References

Footnotes

External links
Craig Coleman at stats.rleague.com
Craig Coleman at NRL Stats
All Time Players Records from 1908-2015

1963 births
Living people
Australian rugby league coaches
Australian rugby league players
Gold Coast Chargers players
Hull F.C. players
Leeds Rhinos players
Rugby league halfbacks
Rugby league players from Sydney
Salford Red Devils players
South Sydney Rabbitohs captains
South Sydney Rabbitohs coaches
South Sydney Rabbitohs players
Western Suburbs Magpies players
Widnes Vikings players